7034 aluminium alloy is a wrought type. It having a very high ultimate tensile strength of 750 MPa.

Chemical Composition

Properties

References

Aluminum alloy table 

Aluminium–zinc alloys